The 1965 Purdue Boilermakers football team represented Purdue University during the 1965 Big Ten Conference football season. Led by tenth-year head coach Jack Mollenkopf, the Boilermakers compiled an overall record of 7–2–1 with a mark of 5–2 in conference play, tying for third place in the Big Ten. Purdue played home games at Ross–Ade Stadium in West Lafayette, Indiana.

Schedule

Roster
 QB Bob Griese, Jr.

Game summaries

Iowa

Michigan

Source:

Indiana

Source:

References

Purdue
Purdue Boilermakers football seasons
Purdue Boilermakers football